From 1919 until 1924, the United States Army Air Service used a system to designate the types of aircraft it was operating, based on role and specific characteristics of the aircraft. When first instituted, Roman numerals were used to number the designations in use. These numerals were only applied to the first 15 types before being abandoned. Air-cooled and Water-cooled refer to the engines installed, while Pursuit was the name given to fighter aircraft in the US Army, at that time. The system was replaced by the 1924 United States Army Air Service aircraft designation system.

List of designations

Source: Bridges

References

Citations

Bibliography
 John M. Andrade, U.S. Military Aircraft Designations and Serials since 1909, Midland Counties Publications, England, 1979, 

American military aviation
United States Army Air Forces lists
United States